Halosaurus johnsonianus, also called the Sahara halosaur, is a  deep-sea fish in the family Halosauridae. It is found in the eastern Atlantic Ocean from southern Spain and Portugal to Mauritania, including the Azores and Canary Islands. It grows to  total length.

Halosaurus johnsonianus is not a fishery species, and no significant threats to it are known.

References

Halosauridae
Fauna of the Azores
Fauna of the Canary Islands
Fish of the East Atlantic
Marine fauna of West Africa
Fish described in 1888